Glenni William Scofield (March 11, 1817 – August 30, 1891) was a United States representative from Pennsylvania, Pennsylvania State Representative, Pennsylvania State Senator, Register of the Treasury and a judge of the Court of Claims.

Education and career

Born on March 11, 1817, in Dewittville, Chautauqua County, New York, Scofield attended the common schools and learned the printing trade. He returned to classical study and graduated from Hamilton College in 1840 and read law with Carlton Brandaga Curtis in Warren, Pennsylvania in 1842, briefly engaging in teaching while studying law. He entered private practice in Warren from 1842 to 1846. He was district attorney for Warren County, Pennsylvania from 1846 to 1848. He was a member of the Pennsylvania House of Representatives from 1849 to 1851. He resumed private practice in Warren circa 1851 to circa 1857. He changed his partisan affiliation from anti-slavery Democratic to Republican in 1856. He served in the Pennsylvania State Senate for the 19th district from 1857 to 1858 and for the 11th district from 1859 to 1860. He was President Judge of the Pennsylvania Court of Common Pleas for the Eighteenth Judicial District from 1861 to 1863.

Congressional service

Scofield was elected from Pennsylvania's 19th congressional district and later Pennsylvania's at-large congressional district as a Republican to the United States House of Representatives of the 38th United States Congress and to the five succeeding Congresses, serving from March 4, 1863, to March 3, 1875. He served as Chairman of the United States House Committee on Revisal and Unfinished Business for the 39th United States Congress and Chairman of the United States House Committee on Naval Affairs for the 41st, 42nd and 43rd United States Congresses. He was not a candidate for renomination in 1874.

Scandal

Scofield was caught up in the scandal involving Congressman Oakes Ames who was censured for selling shares in Credit Mobilier at greatly reduced prices to fellow congressman.  Ames had sold shares in Cedar Rapids stock bonds to Scofield and recommended he purchase shares in Credit Mobilier but the contract for the sale was never completed.

Later career

Following his departure from Congress, Scofield returned to private practice in Warren from 1875 to 1878. He was appointed as the Register of the Treasury for the United States Department of the Treasury by President Rutherford B. Hayes, serving from 1878 to 1881.

Federal judicial service

Scofield was nominated by President James A. Garfield on May 19, 1881, to a seat on the Court of Claims (later the United States Court of Claims) vacated by Judge William H. Hunt. He was confirmed by the United States Senate on May 20, 1881, and received his commission the same day. His service terminated on July 29, 1891, due to his resignation.

Personal life
Scofield's brother was Bryant T. Scofield, a politician in Illinois.

Scofield died on August 30, 1891, in Warren. He was interred in Oakland Cemetery in Warren.

References

Sources

 The Political Graveyard

1817 births
1891 deaths
19th-century American judges
19th-century American politicians
Burials in Pennsylvania
County district attorneys in Pennsylvania
Hamilton College (New York) alumni
Judges of the Pennsylvania Courts of Common Pleas
Judges of the United States Court of Claims
Members of the Pennsylvania House of Representatives
Pennsylvania Democrats
Pennsylvania lawyers
Pennsylvania state senators
People from Chautauqua, New York
People from Warren County, Pennsylvania
Republican Party members of the United States House of Representatives from Pennsylvania
United States Article I federal judges appointed by James A. Garfield
United States Department of the Treasury officials